Deh Kheyr or Deh Khair may refer to:
 Deh Kheyr, Fars
 Deh Kheyr-e Pain, Fars Province
 Deh Kheyr, Semnan
 Deh Kheyr, Tehran